Ten Black Years – Best Of is a best-of compilation album by German thrash metal band Sodom. It was released on CD and cassette in 1996. In 2017, it was released on vinyl for the first time.

Track listing

CD1

CD2

References

1996 compilation albums
Sodom (band) compilation albums
SPV/Steamhammer compilation albums